Thusara Sampath (born 19 November 1974) is a Sri Lankan former cricketer. He played in 49 first-class matches between 1990/91 and 1999/00. After his playing career he became a television news presenter.

References

External links
 

1974 births
Living people
Sri Lankan cricketers
Colts Cricket Club cricketers
Singha Sports Club cricketers
Place of birth missing (living people)